The 2019 Copa do Brasil (officially the Copa Continental Pneus do Brasil 2019 for sponsorship reasons) was the 31st edition of the Copa do Brasil football competition. It was held between 5 February and 18 September 2019. The competition was contested by 91 teams, either qualified through participating in their respective state championships (70), by the 2019 CBF ranking (10), by the 2018 Copa do Nordeste (1), by the 2018 Copa Verde (1), by the 2018 Série B (1) or those qualified for 2019 Copa Libertadores (8).

Athletico Paranaense defeated Internacional 3–1 on aggregate in the finals to win their first title. As champions, Athletico Paranaense qualified for the 2020 Supercopa do Brasil, the 2020 Copa Libertadores group stage and the 2020 Copa do Brasil Round of 16.

Cruzeiro were the defending champions, but lost in the semifinals 0–4 on aggregate to Internacional.

Paolo Guerrero (Internacional) and Fábio (Cruzeiro) won best player and best goalkeeper awards, respectively.

Format
The competition was a single elimination knockout tournament, the first two stages featuring a single match and the other stages featuring two-legged ties. Eleven teams qualified for the Round of 16 (Teams qualified for 2019 Copa Libertadores (8), Série B champions, Copa Verde champions and Copa do Nordeste champions). The remaining 80 teams played the first stage. The 40 winners played the second stage, the 20 winners played the third stage, the 10 winners played the fourth stage. Finally, the five fourth-stage winners qualified for the Round of 16.

Qualified teams
Teams in bold are qualified directly for the round of 16.

Schedule
The schedule of the competition was as follows.

Draw

First stage

Second stage

Third stage

Fourth stage

Final stages

Bracket

Round of 16

Quarter-finals

Semi-finals

Finals

Top goalscorers

References

 
2019
2019 in Brazilian football
2019 domestic association football cups